The 2011–12 Croatian First Football League (officially known as the MAXtv Prva Liga for sponsorship reasons) was the 21st season of the Croatian First Football League, the national championship for men's association football teams in Croatia, since its establishment in 1992. The season started on 23 July 2011 and ended on 12 May 2012.

Format changes
On 5 July 2010 the Croatian Football Federation Executive committee reached a decision to reduce the number of teams competing in Prva HNL to twelve for the 2011–12 season of the competition. This meant that the bottom five placed teams would be relegated and only the champion of the 2010–11 Druga HNL would earn a promotion to Prva HNL. This decision was confirmed by the Croatian Football Federation Assembly on 14 July 2010. The twelve-teams format would only be a temporary solution before the number of teams is further reduced to ten for either 2012–13 or 2013–14 Prva HNL season.

The decision to reduce the number of teams competing in Prva HNL was supported by 30 out of 48 Croatian Football Federation representatives, with 13 representatives voting against the proposal and five of them undecided. On behalf of the Executive committee, Ante Vučemilović explained that the current format with sixteen teams does not contribute to development of football in Croatia and the standard of its domestic competitions.

However, CFF Assembly on 17 December 2010 delayed the execution of this changes by one year. Instead, the league will stay at 16 teams with only the last three teams being relegated and the first three teams from 2010–11 Druga HNL earning promotion (if they are granted with top level license). In case of 16 teams not acquiring top level license, format with 12 teams will be applied.

On 4 April 2011, CFF announced that the first stage of licensing procedure for 2011–12 season was completed. For the 2011–12 Prva HNL, only eight clubs were issued a top level license: Dinamo Zagreb, Hajduk Split, Inter Zaprešić, Istra 1961, Lokomotiva, Slaven Belupo, Varaždin and NK Zagreb. Out of these eight, only Lokomotiva and NK Zagreb weren't issued a license for participating in UEFA competitions. In the second stage of licensing procedure clubs that didn't get a license appealed on the decision and provided new facts and arguments. On 4 May 2011, it was announced that all remaining Prva HNL clubs were granted top level license. Additionally, Cibalia, Rijeka and RNK Split obtained a license for UEFA competitions. Only three teams from Druga HNL acquired the top level license: Dugopolje, Gorica and Lučko, where the latter two are set to play outside of their home venues.

However, Dugopolje didn't manage to finish the season within top five places which would secure them promotion. The remaining clubs were given a deadline until 6 June 2011 to confirm their participation in the 2011–12 season. All clubs of the previous Prva HNL season have done so, with Druga HNL teams Lučko and Gorica applying on the last day. This meant that the format with 16 teams was prolonged by one more season, meaning five clubs are going to be relegated at the end of this season. The status of 14th placed Lokomotiva was in question after the 3rd placed team from Druga HNL, Pomorac, contested the decision of CFF and tried to obtain the license through arbitration. On 9 June 2011, arbitrary committee rejected the appeal with two votes against one. Istra 1961 appealed on the decision to include Gorica in the Prva HNL on terms of their license conditions concerning stadium infrastructure. The appeal was successful and on 20 June 2011 arbitrary committee revoked Gorica's top level license allowing Istra 1961 to remain in the Prva HNL.

Stadia and locations
The following is a complete list of teams who will contest the 2011–12 Prva HNL. The league will be contested by 15 clubs from the previous season plus the newly promoted NK Lučko who replaced the bottom placed team from the previous season, NK Hrvatski Dragovoljac. Druga HNL champions HNK Gorica were initially promoted, but after the appeal from  NK Istra 1961, their license was revoked.

Personnel and kits

Managerial changes

League table

Results

Top goalscorers
As of 12 May 2012; Source: Prva-HNL

See also
2011–12 Croatian Football Cup
2011–12 Croatian Second Football League

References

External links
Official website 
Prva HNL at UEFA.com

Croatian Football League seasons
Cro
1